Borussia Dortmund (Ballspielverein Borussia 1909 e.V. Dortmund, BVB, BVB 09) is a German women's handball team from Dortmund. They compete in the Handball-Bundesliga Frauen since 2015–2016 season, the top division in Germany.

They won the Handball-Bundesliga Frauen in 2021 and competed in the 2021–22 Women's EHF Champions League the following season.

Kits

Honours
Handball-Bundesliga Frauen:
Winners: 2021
Bronze: 2000
DHB-Pokal:
Winners: 1997
Finalists: 2016
EHF Challenge Cup:
Finalists: 2003

Team

Current squad
Squad for the 2022–23 season 

Goalkeepers
 12  Sophie Amalie Moth
 15  Madita Kohorst
 16  Yara ten Holte
Wingers
LW
 6  Zoë Sprengers
 33  Anna-Lena Hausherr
RW
 8  Maraike Kusian
 22  Meret Ossenkopp
Line players
 9  Lisa Antl
 29  Emma Olsson 
 31  Zoe Stens

Back players
LB
 11  Harma van Kreij
 23  Haruno Sasaki 
 66  Dana Bleckmann 
CB
 4  Alina Grijseels 
 30  Frida Nåmo Rønning
RB
 94  Sara Garović

Transfers
Transfers for the 2023–24 season 

 Joining
  Isabell Roch (GK) (from  SCM Râmnicu Vâlcea)
  Alicia Stolle (RB) (from  Ferencvárosi TC)
  Sarah Wachter (GK) (from  Neckarsulmer SU)

 Leaving
 Yara ten Holte (GK) (to  Odense Håndbold)
 Alina Grijseels (CB)  (to  Metz Handball)
 Madita Kohorst (GK) (to  VfL Oldenburg)

Notable former players

  Franziska Heinz
  Eike Bram
  Michaela Erler
  Silke Gnad
  Nadine Härdter
  Ulrike Stange
  Nadja Nadgornaja
  Clara Woltering
  Svenja Huber
  Isabell Roch
  Jennifer Rode
  Mia Zschocke
  Amelie Berger
  Kelly Vollebregt
  Kelly Dulfer
  Inger Smits
  Rinka Duijndam
  Laura van der Heijden
  Merel Freriks
  Ágnes Farkas
  Míra Emberovics
  Virág Vaszari
  Bogna Sobiech
  Aleksandra Zych
  Emilia Galińska
  Narcisa Lecușanu
  Lidia Drăgănescu
  Tonje Sagstuen
  Kari Solem
  Tina Abdulla
  Mie Sophie Sando
  Irene Espínola
  Jennifer Gutiérrez Bermejo
  Hildigunnur Einarsdóttir
  Clara Monti Danielsson 
  Kim Eun-mi
  Asuka Fujita 
  Sally Potocki

Statistics

Top scorers in the EHF Champions League 
(All-Time) – Last updated at the end of 2021/22 season

European record

EHF Champions League

EHF European League (EHF Cup)

EHF Cup Winners' Cup

EHF Challenge Cup

References

External links
 Official site
 

German handball clubs
Handball clubs established in 1909
1909 establishments in Germany
Women's handball clubs
Women's handball in Germany
Sport in Dortmund